Bath Township may refer to:

Bath Township, Mason County, Illinois
Bath Township, Franklin County, Indiana
Bath Township, Cerro Gordo County, Iowa
Bath Township, Michigan
Bath Township, Minnesota
Bath Township, Allen County, Ohio
Bath Township, Greene County, Ohio
Bath Township, Summit County, Ohio
Bath Township, Brown County, South Dakota

Township name disambiguation pages